NCAA basketball tournament may refer to the following:

In the United States:
NCAA Division I men's basketball tournament (March Madness)
NCAA Division I women's basketball tournament
NCAA Division II men's basketball tournament
NCAA Division II women's basketball tournament
NCAA Division III men's basketball tournament
NCAA Division III women's basketball tournament

In the Philippines:
NCAA Basketball Championship (Philippines)